Kotówka  (Kotivka) is a village in the administrative district of Gmina Hajnówka, within Hajnówka County, Podlaskie Voivodeship, in north-eastern Poland, close to the border with Belarus. Kotówka is famous for wooden huts with traditional decoration on them for example huts from address Kotówka 9 and 13.

References

Villages in Hajnówka County